Reda Jaadi (born 14 February 1995) is a Belgium-born Moroccan footballer who plays as a midfielder for the Moroccan club Wydad AC.

International career
Reda Jaadi played two games for Belgium U17 at the 2012 European Under-17 Championship qualifiers.

Jaadi eventually switched allegiance and played one game for Morocco, appearing in a 5–2 victory against Uganda at the 2020 African Nations Championship, a tournament which was eventually won by Morocco.

Personal life
Jaadi was born in Brussels, Belgium on 14 February 1995 and is of Moroccan descent. Reda is the brother of the Moroccan youth international, Nabil Jaadi.

Honours

Club
Wydad AC
CAF Champions League: 2021–22
Botola: 2021–22

International
Morocco
African Nations Championship: 2020

References

External links

1995 births
Living people
Belgian sportspeople of Moroccan descent
Belgian footballers
Belgium youth international footballers
Moroccan footballers
Morocco international footballers
Association football midfielders
Belgian Pro League players
Standard Liège players
K.F.C. Dessel Sport players
C.S. Visé players
K.V. Mechelen players
Royal Antwerp F.C. players
Liga I players
FC Dinamo București players
Fath Union Sport players
Botola players
Belgian expatriate footballers
Belgian expatriate sportspeople in Romania
Expatriate footballers in Romania
2020 African Nations Championship players
Footballers from Brussels
Morocco A' international footballers
Moroccan expatriate footballers
Moroccan expatriate sportspeople in Romania